Donald Lee Avery (February 10, 1921 – August 8, 2006) was an American football offensive tackle in the National Football League for the Washington Redskins, as well as the Los Angeles Dons of the All-America Football Conference. He played college football at the University of Alabama and the University of Southern California in 1941-42 as an offensive lineman.

Avery served in the United States Army Air Forces during the World War II era. While in the military, he played tackle for the Second Army Air Forces Superbombers football team in 1944.

References

External links

1921 births
2006 deaths
Players of American football from Los Angeles
American football offensive tackles
Alabama Crimson Tide football players
Second Air Force Superbombers football players
USC Trojans football players
Washington Redskins players
Los Angeles Dons players
United States Army Air Forces soldiers
United States Army Air Forces personnel of World War II
Wilmington Clippers players